The McLain Rogers Park, in Clinton, Oklahoma, was built in 1934 and following years.  It includes Art Deco architecture.  It has also been known as Clinton City Park.  It was listed on the National Register of Historic Places in 2004. The listing included four contributing buildings, nine contributing structures, and a contributing object.

It has a striking entranceway, its East Gate, fronting onto Route 66.

It was developed in multiple projects funded by New Deal programs: the Federal Emergency Relief Administration, the Civil Works Administration, and the Works Progress Administration.

References

Parks in Oklahoma
National Register of Historic Places in Custer County, Oklahoma
Art Deco architecture in Oklahoma
Buildings and structures completed in 1934
1934 establishments in Oklahoma
Civil Works Administration
Works Progress Administration in Oklahoma